Federal Highway 55 (Carretera Federal 55) (Fed. 55) is a free (libre) part of the federal highways corridors (los corredores carreteros federales) of Mexico. The highway connects Puerta de Palmillas, Querétaro to the north and Axixintla, Guerrero to the south.

References

055
Transportation in Guerrero
Transportation in Querétaro